Cothresia is a genus of beetles in the family Carabidae, containing the following species:

 Cothresia baleensis Basilewsky, 1974
 Cothresia clarkeiana Basilewsky, 1974
 Cothresia curta Jeannel, 1964
 Cothresia humeralis (Jeannel, 1930)
 Cothresia minuta Basilewsky, 1974
 Cothresia robini Basilewsky, 1974
 Cothresia rotundicollis Basilewsky, 1974
 Cothresia rougemonti Basilewsky, 1975
 Cothresia scitula (Peringuey, 1896)
 Cothresia tabulae (Peringuey, 1899)

References

Trechinae